Polish Rugby Union (Polish: Polski Związek Rugby), abbreviated to PZR, is the only legal Polish representative of Polish rugby union and rugby sevens for both men and women's rugby and all age groups.

History

The Polish Rugby Union (Polski Związek Rugby) was founded in 1957, although rugby had already existed in Poland since the 1920s, when in 1921, Louis Amblard, a Frenchman, set up the very first Polish rugby club called "The White Eagles". The first match was in 1922, and the first club international in 1924 against a Romanian side. There was, however, an earlier Polish Rugby Union set up in the early 1920s, but disbanded in 1928, as the sport failed to gain much popularity and historical disruptions such as World War II and Molotov–Ribbentrop Pact halted development, which why it was not until the 1950s that the sport re-emerged. Poland's first ever rugby season was in 1956 between September and December. There was no national league but only 5 regional divisions which were meant to determine who shall play in the top flight which was to be established later on. PZR joined the IRFB in 1988.
The official supplier of equipment to the PRU is O'Brien sport.

In 1921, Louis Amblard, a Frenchman, set up the very first Polish rugby club called "The White Eagles". The first match was in 1922, and the first club international in 1924 against a Romanian side.

The game became established in the Warsaw Military Academy in the early 1930s.

The tragic events of World War II, the Molotov–Ribbentrop Pact etc., meant that the growth of Polish rugby was retarded until the 1950s. During World War II, there were occasional games between allied POWs in German camps in Poland. For example, a game was held between a Scottish and a Welsh XV, in ten inches of snow. No conversions were allowed, as the ball would have gone over the camp fence, and the game was twenty minutes each way. Players wore army boots, trousers, prison shirts and balaclavas.

Polish rugby arguably achieved its greatest success in the late 1970s when the national team beat Italy, Spain and the USSR, and also held Romania to a 37–21 win in 1977.

"Much to everyone's surprise, Eastern Bloc countries are among the game's vigorous participants, seemingly oblivious to rugby's capitalist class-ridden origins. Russia emerged from behind the Iron Curtain and came under international scrutiny when they played France in Toulouse in November 1978. Rumania, Poland and Czechoslovakia are members of the Federation Internationale de Rugby Amateur, the governing body for those countries not in the IB."

In 1983, Poland failed to play  in the FIRA Championships, and told FIRA that two of their players had died. It is not known where the other died, but one had died near Bucharest.

The Cold War frequently intruded – for example in the 1984 FIRA Championships, in the game against France, Poland demanded the removal of the French players Didier Camberabero, Henri Sanz and the Brive RFC centre Yves Fouget, because as members of the French armed forces, they were considered to be a security risk.

Because of high Polish emigration, particularly to France, and English speaking nations, the Polish team actually has a fairly large pool of potential players. In addition,
a number of Poles returning from jobs in the British Isles and France, have carried the game back with them.

There are currently three divisions in Poland. The second division was relaunched in 2009 using some of the major teams providing 2nd XVs, along with some newly formed sides. The top division has 8 teams while the second division has 6 teams. Prior to that in 2008/2009 there were 10 teams in the top division and only 4 in the second. This led to some very uneven contests between the top teams and those at the bottom of the league. There is now also a regional league played in the centre of Poland (around Lodz and Warsaw) in which some smaller clubs have entered teams and second teams from some of the top clubs nationally compete.

Polish rugby development, however, has tended to concentrate on rugby sevens as a means of introducing the sport to people. The PRU organises regular one day sevens tournaments over the spring/summer with teams travelling from all over the country. There are teams forming all over the country, but there is a shortage of quality coaching and basic equipment. Despite this rugby is making good headway.

Rugby tens also has some popularity.

International

The PZR governs currently several senior Polish rugby teams. The most notable is the Poland national rugby union team, however there is also a Poland women's national rugby union team. There are also both men's and women's rugby sevens national teams.

Poland's international debut was in 1958 against , and they won the match 9–8.

They compete in the second division competition Rugby Europe Trophy, where the winner is promoted to the Premier Division Rugby Europe Championship. In 2018, Poland competed against Portugal, Netherlands, Czech Republic, Switzerland, and Maldova.

In 2018, the Polish XV Men's team was ranked 35 in the world. They also compete in the VII's Europe Grand Prix 7s Series.

Women's Polish Rugby compete in the Women's 7s GPS, where they play other European countries, such as Ireland, Wales, Scotland, Italy, France, Russia and Germany

Men's Rugby 
The PZR governs the 3 domestic national divisions. The second division was relaunched in 2009 using some of the major teams providing 2nd XVs, along with some newly formed sides. The top division has 8 teams while the second division has 6 teams. Prior to that in 2008/2009 there were 10 teams in the top division and only 4 in the second. This led to some very uneven contests between the top teams and those at the bottom of the league. There are now also regional leagues in which some smaller clubs have entered teams and second teams from some of the top clubs which compete nationally.

The current league system has been in place since 2011/2012.

XV Rugby

Tier 1 – Extraliga
Rugby Ekstraliga
Teams 
Ogniwo Sopot
Skra Warszawa
Juvenia Kraków
Budowlani Łódź
Lechia Gdańsk
Pogoń Siedlce
Arka Gdynia
Budowlani Lublin
Orkan Sochaczew
Sparta Jarocin

Tier 2 – Liga I
I liga
Teams
Sparta Jarocin
AZS AWF Warszawa
Rugby Białystok
Zielona Góra
Miedzi Lubin
Legia Warszawa

Tier 3 – Liga II
II liga Rugby Teams
RC Posnania
Ark Rumia
Alfa Bydgoszcz
Mazovia Minsk Mazowiecki
Rugby Ruda Śląska

Seven's Rugby

Polish rugby development, has tended to concentrate on rugby sevens as a means of introducing the sport to people. The PRU organises regular one day sevens tournaments over the spring/summer with teams travelling from all over the country. There are teams forming all over the country, but there is a shortage of quality coaching and basic equipment. Despite this rugby sevens is making good headway, and the national team regularly competes in tournaments.

Rugby tens also has some popularity,

Seven's Teams

Posnania Poznań
Lechia Gdańsk
GTR Tytan Gniezno
Juvenia Kraków
RC Orkan Sochaczew

AZS AWFiS Gdańsk 
Rugby Bełchatów 
Werewolves Wąbrzeźno
Rugby Team Olsztyn

Kaskada Szczecin
Szarża Grudziądz
Budowlani Łódź SA 
KS Budowlani Łódź

Women's rugby
Although Poland's women have not yet played test match rugby, they have been playing international sevens rugby since 2005. (Current playing record).

Seven's Rugby
Teams

Biało-Zielone Ladies Gdańsk
Black Roses Posnania Poznań
Legia Warszawa
Juvenia Kraków

AZS AWF Warszawa
Legia II Warszawa
Miedziowe Lubin

KS Rugby Gierzwałd
Flota Gdynia
Diablice Ruda Śląska
Tygrysice Orkan Sochaczew

Youth and Children rugby
Poland rugby has a youth tournament for different age groups.

XV and Seven's Rugby
Teams

UKS Piątka Wilda Poznań
KS BBRC Łódź
UKS Karb przy MDK 2 Bytom 
UKS Cisowa Arka Gdynia 
UKS Dziesiątka Gdynia 
UKS Gorce Raba Niżna 
SP Grodysławice 

Hegemon Akademia Rugby 
UKS Kadet Rachanie
UKS Koziołki Jerzykowo-Biskupice 
UKS Rugby Lubień
KS Marlin Ozorków 
Miejski Klub Rugby Siedlce 
KR Owal Leszno 

UKS Osiemdziesiątka Sochaczew 
UKS Rugby Czeczewo 
Rugby Gorzów Wielkopolski 
UKS Strzałka 
SP Wożuczyn 
UKS Żaczek Michalów

Regional bodies
The PZR is divided into 6 regional governing bodies, each with their own president:
 Masovian: Warszawsko - Mazowiecki Okręgowy Związek Rugby - Andrzej Suliga
 Pomerania: Pomorski Okręgowy Związek Rugby – Przemysław Szablewski
 Warmia-Masuria: Warmińsko-Mazurski Okręgowy Związek Rugby – Henryk Pach
 Greater Poland: Wielkopolski Okręgowy Związek Rugby – Roman Augustyniak
 Lubelian: Lubelski Okręgowy Związek Rugby – Wiesław Piotrowicz
 Silesia: Śląski Okręgowy Związek Rugby – Teresa Jarczyk
 Lesser Poland: Małopolski Okręgowy Związek Rugby – Dariusz Grzyb

See also
 Rugby union in Poland
 Poland national rugby union team
 Poland national rugby sevens team
 Poland women's national rugby sevens team
 Ekstraliga

References

Rugby union in Poland
Rugby union governing bodies in Europe
Rugby
World Rugby members
Sports organizations established in 1957
1957 establishments in Poland